The 2019 UCI Junior Track Cycling World Championships are the annual Junior World Championship for track cycling hold at Frankfurt (Oder), Germany from 14 to 18 August 2019.

Medal summary

Notes 
 Competitors named in italics only participated in rounds prior to the final.

Medal table

References

External links

Official website
Results
Results book 

UCI Juniors Track World Championships
UCI Junior Track Cycling World Championships
UCI Junior Track Cycling World Championships
2019 UCI Junior Track Cycling World Championships
UCI Junior Track Cycling World Championships